Corythodinium is a genus of dinoflagellates in the family Oxytoxaceae.

References

External links 

 

Dinoflagellate genera